Tyree Wilson (born May 20, 2000) is an American football outside linebacker. He played college football at Texas A&M and Texas Tech.

Early life and high school career
Wilson grew up in Henderson, Texas, and attended West Rusk High School. As a senior, he made 126 tackles with 38 tackles for loss, five forced fumbles, and five fumbles recovered. Wilson was rated a three-star recruit and initially committed to play college football at Washington State before decommitting before the start of his senior year. He ultimately committed to play at Texas A&M.

College career
Wilson began his college career at Texas A&M and redshirted his true freshman season. As a redshirt freshman he played in 11 games and made 12 tackles with three tackles for loss and one sack. Wilson entered the NCAA transfer portal after the end of the season.

Wilson ultimately transferred to Texas Tech. He was granted a waiver by the NCAA to play immediately instead of having to sit out one season per transfer rules. Wilson became a starter on the Red Raiders' defense towards the end of his first season with the team. As a redshirt junior, he had 38 tackles and led the team with 13.5 tackles for loss and seven sacks. Wilson was named the Defensive MVP of the 2021 Liberty Bowl after making two sacks in the game. In 2022 against Kansas, Wilson suffered a season-ending foot injury. Wilson later announced that he would forgo his senior year and declare for the NFL Draft. Following the conclusion of the regular season, Wilson was selected to the All-Big 12 First Team.

References

External links
 Texas Tech Red Raiders bio
 Texas A&M Aggies bio

Living people
Players of American football from Texas
American football linebackers
Texas A&M Aggies football players
Texas Tech Red Raiders football players
2000 births